Massimo Zilli (born 17 July 2002) is an Italian football player. He plays for Cosenza.

Club career
He made his Serie B debut for Cosenza on 10 April 2022 in a game against Monza.

References

External links
 

2002 births
Living people
Italian footballers
Association football forwards
Cosenza Calcio players
Serie B players